Hexafluorosilicic acid is an inorganic compound with the chemical formula . Aqueous solutions of hexafluorosilicic acid consist of salts of the cation and hexafluorosilicate anion. These salts and their aqueous solutions are colorless.

Hexafluorosilicic acid is produced naturally on a large scale in volcanoes. It is manufactured as a coproduct in the production of phosphate fertilizers.  The resulting hexafluorosilicic acid is almost exclusively consumed as a precursor to aluminum trifluoride and synthetic cryolite, which are used in aluminium processing. Salts derived from hexafluorosilicic acid are called hexafluorosilicates.

Structure 

Hexafluorosilicic acid has been crystallized as various hydrates. These include (H5O2)2SiF6, the more complicated (H5O2)2SiF6·2H2O, and (H5O2)(H7O3)SiF6·4.5H2O.  In all of these salts, the octahedral hexafluorosilicate anion is hydrogen bonded to the cations.

Production and principal reactions
Hexafluorosilicic acid is produced commercially from fluoride-containing minerals that also contain silicates. Specifically, apatite and fluorapatite are treated with sulfuric acid to give phosphoric acid, a precursor to several water-soluble fertilizers. This is called the wet phosphoric acid process. As a by-product, approximately 50 kg of hexafluorosilicic acid is produced per tonne of HF owing to reactions involving silica-containing mineral impurities.

Some of the hydrogen fluoride (HF) produced during this process in turn reacts with silicon dioxide (SiO2) impurities, which are unavoidable constituents of the mineral feedstock, to give silicon tetrafluoride. Thus formed, the silicon tetrafluoride reacts further with HF.  The net process can be described as:
6HF +  → SiF62- + 2 H3O+
Hexafluorosilicic acid can also be produced by treating silicon tetrafluoride with hydrofluoric acid.

Reactions 
In water, hexafluorosilicic acid readily hydrolyzes to hydrofluoric acid and various forms of amorphous and hydrated silica ("SiO2"). At the concentration usually used for water fluoridation, 99% hydrolysis occurs and the pH drops. The rate of hydrolysis increases with pH. At the pH of drinking water, the degree of hydrolysis is essentially 100%.
H2SiF6  +  2 H2O  →  6 HF + "SiO2"

Near neutral pH, hexafluorosilicate salts hydrolyze rapidly according to this equation:
  +  2 H2O   →   6 F−   +  SiO2  +  4 H+

Alkali and alkaline earth salts 
Neutralization of solutions of hexafluorosilicic acid with alkali metal bases produces the corresponding alkali metal fluorosilicate salts:
H2SiF6 + 2 NaOH → Na2SiF6  +  2 H2O
The resulting salt Na2SiF6 is mainly used in water fluoridation. Related ammonium and barium salts are produced similarly for other applications. At room temperature 15-30% concentrated hexafluorosilicic acid undergoes similar reactions with chlorides, hydroxides, and carbonates of alkali and alkaline earth metals.

Sodium hexafluorosilicate for instance may be produced by treating sodium chloride by hexafluorosilicic acid:

   
   

Heating sodium hexafluorosilicate gives silicon tetrafluoride:

Uses 
The majority of the hexafluorosilicic acid is converted to aluminium fluoride and synthetic cryolite. These materials are central to the conversion of aluminium ore into aluminium metal.  The conversion to aluminium trifluoride is described as:
H2SiF6  +  Al2O3  →  2 AlF3  +  SiO2  +  H2O

Hexafluorosilicic acid is also converted to a variety of useful hexafluorosilicate salts. The  potassium salt, Potassium fluorosilicate, is used in the production of porcelains, the magnesium salt for hardened concretes and as an insecticide, and the barium salts for phosphors.

Hexafluorosilicic acid and the salts are used as wood preservation agents.

Lead refining 
Hexafluorosilicic acid is also used as an electrolyte in the Betts electrolytic process for refining lead.

Rust removers 
Hexafluorosilicic acid (identified as hydrofluorosilicic acid on the label) along with oxalic acid are the active ingredients used in Iron Out rust-removing cleaning products, which are essentially varieties of laundry sour.

Niche applications
H2SiF6 is a specialized reagent in organic synthesis for cleaving Si–O bonds of silyl ethers.  It is more reactive for this purpose than HF.  It reacts faster with t-butyldimethysilyl (TBDMS) ethers than triisopropylsilyl (TIPS) ethers.

Treating concrete 
The application of hexafluorosilica acid to a calcium rich surface such as concrete will give that surface some resistance to acid attack.
CaCO3 + H2O →  Ca2+ + 2 OH− + CO2
H2SiF6 → 2 H+ + 
  +  2 H2O   →   6 F−   +  SiO2  +  4 H+
  Ca2+ + 2 F− → CaF2

Calcium fluoride (CaF2) is an insoluble solid that is acid resistant.

Natural salts
Some rare minerals, encountered either within volcanic or coal-fire fumaroles, are salts of the hexafluorosilicic acid. Examples include ammonium hexafluorosilicate that naturally occurs as two polymorphs: cryptohalite and bararite.

Safety
Hexafluorosilicic acid can release hydrogen fluoride (HF) when evaporated, so it has similar risks. Inhalation of the vapors may cause lung edema. Like hydrogen fluoride, it attacks glass and stoneware. The LD50 value of hexafluorosilicic acid is 430 mg/kg.

See also
 Ammonium fluorosilicate
 Sodium fluorosilicate
 Potassium fluorosilicate

References

Mineral acids
Hydrogen compounds
Nonmetal halides
Hexafluorosilicates
Fluoro complexes